A slough ( or ) is a wetland, usually a swamp or shallow lake, often a backwater to a larger body of water. Water tends to be stagnant or may flow slowly on a seasonal basis.

In North America, "slough" may refer to a side-channel from or feeding a river, or an inlet or natural channel only sporadically filled with water. An example of this is Finn Slough on the Fraser River, whose lower reaches have dozens of notable sloughs.  Some sloughs, like Elkhorn Slough, used to be mouths of rivers, but have become stagnant because tectonic activity cut off the river's source.

In the Sacramento River, Steamboat Slough was an alternate branch of the river, a preferred shortcut route for steamboats passing between Sacramento and San Francisco.  Georgiana Slough was a steamboat route through the Sacramento–San Joaquin River Delta, from the Sacramento River to the San Joaquin River and Stockton.

Plants and animals

A slough, also called a tidal channel, is a channel in a wetland. Typically, it is either stagnant or slow flowing on a seasonal basis.

Vegetation patterns in a slough are largely determined by depth, distribution, and duration of in the environment. Moreover, these same variables also influence the distribution, abundance, reproduction, and seasonal movements of aquatic and terrestrial life within the sloughs. Sloughs support a wide variety of plant life that is adapted to rapidly changing physical conditions such as salinity, oxygen levels and depth.

In general, sloughs are microhabitats high in species diversity. Open water sloughs are characterized by submerged and floating vegetation which includes periphyton mats dominated by sawgrass typically. The topographical and vegetation heterogeneity of ridge and slough landscape influences the productivity and diversity of birds and fish adapted to that wetland.

Fish that typically inhabit sloughs include tidewater goby, California killifish, mosquitofish, and topsmelt. Food habits of fish within sloughs consist of preying upon invertebrates; mostly epifaunal crustacean followed by epifaunal and infaunal worms and mollusks. Fish can feed on zooplankton and plant material. Research on prey species for fish in sloughs found that in a study done on Elkhorn Slough in California the mean prey richness for fish was greatest near the ocean and lowest inshore. This allows for a higher availability of food to enhance the function of inshore habitats and emphasizes the importance of invertebrate prey populations and how they influence plant production.

Birds also inhabit sloughs. Sloughs are hotspots for bird watching. For example, the Elkhorn Slough in the western United States is one of the premier bird watching sites in the western United States. Over 340 species are seen visiting including several rare and endangered species. Species of birds seen in sloughs such as the Elkhorn slough include  acorn woodpecker, brown pelican, Caspian tern, great blue heron, great egret, great horned owl, snowy plover, and white-tailed kite.

Sloughs are largely influenced by human development such as urban and agricultural expansion, industrial and agricultural practices, water management practices, and humans influence on species composition. Uses of identifying these aspects of human involvement can help to better predict restoration efforts to be made in managing sloughs. Examples of attributes that are affected by human stress upon the environment include periphyton, marsh plant communities, tree islands, alligators, wading birds, and marsh fishes, invertebrates, and herpetofauna.

Formation

A slough can form when a meander gets cut off from the main river channel creating an oxbow lake that accumulates with fine overbank sediment and organic material such as peat. This creates a wetland or swamp environment. One end of the oxbow configuration then continues to receive flow from the main channel, creating a slough.

Sloughs are typically associated with the ridge formations found in their presence. Such a landscape consists of mosaic linear ridges, typically of some sort of grass such as sawgrass ridges in the Florida Everglades, that are separated by deeper water sloughs.

Edges of sloughs are layers of sediment deposited by a river over time. The development of this landscape is thought to occur by the preferential formation of peat in bedrock depressions. Multiple of these deposits mounted on top of the surrounding bedrock can become elongated alongside the slough and create flow diversions within the system. Different rates of this peat accumulation could be triggered by variations in microtopography that alter plant production and vegetation type. Water flow might be the key to preventing an accumulation of organic sediment in sloughs due to the fact that accumulation leads to lowering water depths and instead allows for the growth of vegetation.

Degradation

Overall little quantitative data on the degradation of slough landscape exists. Slough and ridge landscape has been greatly degraded in terms of both topographic and vegetation changes over time. Topographical changes create an increase in the relief between ridge crests and slough bottoms. Vegetation changes consist of an increase in the amount of dense grass and decrease in the area of open water, creating a blurring of the directional ridge and slough pattern.

Historical everglade and slough landscape has been greatly affected and degraded by human activity. Open water sloughs support important ecological functions that have been seen to be sensitive to hydrologic and water quality problems stemmed from human activities.

Restoration

Sloughs are ecologically important as they are a part of an endangered environment; wetlands. They act as a buffer from land to sea and act as an active part of the estuary system where freshwater flows from creeks and runoff from the land mix with salty ocean water transported by tides. Restoration is a big effort in California wetlands to restore slough and ridge landscapes. Examples of restoration projects on slough landscapes include The Elkhorn Slough Tidal Wetland Project, Dutch Slough Tidal Restoration Project, and the McDaniel Slough wetland enhancement project.

See also

References

Hydrology
Wetlands
River morphology